Christine L'Heureux is a Canadian author and publisher who, with illustrator Hélène Desputeaux, created "Caillou", a successful series of children's books that later spawned a animated television series with the same name in 1997.

References 

Canadian children's writers in French
Living people
Canadian women children's writers
French Quebecers 
Year of birth missing (living people)